Dhanu Rosadhe (born June 22, 1989 in Tuban, Tuban Regency, East Java) is an Indonesian professional footballer who plays for LIga 2 club Persatu Tuban.

Club statistics

References

External links

1989 births
Living people
People from Tuban
Association football midfielders
Indonesian footballers
Liga 1 (Indonesia) players
Persela Lamongan players
Sportspeople from East Java